Brandon Michael Harry Yip (born April 25, 1985) is a Chinese-Canadian professional ice hockey right wing who is currently playing with HC Kunlun Red Star of the Kontinental Hockey League (KHL). He has previously played in the National Hockey League for the Colorado Avalanche, Nashville Predators, and the Phoenix Coyotes. He is of 3/4 Chinese and 1/4 Irish descent.

Playing career
The Avalanche drafted Yip in the 8th round, 239th overall in the 2004 NHL Entry Draft. He played amateur junior hockey with the Coquitlam Express of the BCHL before enrolling to play collegiate hockey with Boston University of the Hockey East. In his freshman year in 2005–06, Yip scored 31 points in 39 games and was named Hockey East rookie of the year. In his junior year with the Terriers in 2007–08, Yip served an indefinite suspension for breaking team rules before returning to finish with 23 points in 37 games. After winning the NCAA Men's Ice Hockey Championship with the Terriers in his senior year in 2008–09, Yip graduated from Boston University with high honors with a B.S. in criminal justice.

On July 22, 2009, Yip signed a one-year entry-level contract with the Avalanche. Before his first pro season in 2009–10, Yip suffered a broken hand in a pre-season game that sidelined him for the first two months of the year. He made his professional debut with the Avalanche's American Hockey League affiliate, the Lake Erie Monsters, for a six-game stint. Colorado recalled him on December 19, 2009, to make his NHL debut in a 5-2 home win against the Columbus Blue Jackets. Yip scored his first goal three days later against Jonas Hiller of the Anaheim Ducks. In his first 22 games he scored 11 goals before suffering a separated shoulder against the Detroit Red Wings on March 1, 2010. Yip ended his 2009-10 campaign leading all rookies in goals per game average. After finishing second on the Avalanche in playoff scoring with four points against the San Jose Sharks in the conference quarterfinals, Yip was re-signed to a two-year contract on July 7, 2010. On November 6, 2010, he registered a Gordie Howe hat trick during a 5-0 victory over the Dallas Stars.

During the 2011–12 season, after ten scoreless games with the Avalanche, Yip was placed on waivers and claimed by the Nashville Predators on January 19, 2012. On January 24, he had his debut for the Predators in a 3-1 victory over the Chicago Blackhawks. Yip established a role on the Predators lower checking lines, scoring 3 goals, including two in two games against his former club Colorado, and 7 points in 25 games.

The Predators re-signed Yip to a one-year contract on June 21, 2012. In the lockout shortened 2012–13 season, Yip transitioned quickly to contribute 5 points in his first ten games of the campaign before finishing with 8 points in 34 games. He missed the final eight games of the year due to injury.

On July 19, 2013, Yip was signed as a free agent by the Phoenix Coyotes to a one-year, two-way contract. After attending the Coyotes training camp, Yip failed to make the opening night roster and was assigned to the AHL for the first time since 2009 with affiliate, the Portland Pirates. In the early stages of the 2013–14 season, Yip was recalled to Phoenix to appear in 2 games before he was reassigned to the Pirates for the remainder of the campaign.

Unsigned into the off-season, Yip accepted an invitation to attend the Anaheim Ducks 2014 training camp on a professional try-out contract on September 18, 2014. Yip failed to earn an NHL contract with the Ducks, however, was reassigned and signed with AHL affiliate, the Norfolk Admirals to begin the 2014–15 season. Yip produced 12 points in 31 games with the Admirals before he was loaned to play in the ECHL for the first time in his career with the Utah Grizzlies on January 15, 2015.

After seven games with the Grizzlies, Yip sought a release from his contract with Norfolk, and on February 6, 2015, it was announced that Yip had signed his first contract abroad with German club Adler Mannheim for the rest of the DEL season. On October 20, 2016, he inked a deal with another German side, putting pen to paper on a contract for the remainder of the 2016–17 campaign with Düsseldorfer EG.

As a free agent, with the ambition to follow his Chinese origins and represent at the 2022 Winter Olympics, Yip left Germany and signed a contract with Chinese club, HC Kunlun Red Star of the Kontinental Hockey League (KHL) on June 5, 2017.

As team captain in two of his three seasons with Kunlun, Yip was left un-signed leading into the pandemic affected 2020–21 season. On January 9, 2021, he was belatedly signed to join Finnish club, Mikkelin Jukurit of the Liiga, for the remainder of the season. He made 15 regular season appearances, recording 2 goals and 6 points, in his short tenure in the Liiga.

As a free agent heading into an Olympic year with ambitions to appear with the Chinese national team, Yip returned to his former club, Kunlun Red Star of the KHL, on a one-year deal on July 26, 2021.

International play
Due to his tenure in China, Yip was formally called up to represent the China men's national ice hockey team for the 2022 Winter Olympics on January 28, 2022.

Career statistics

Regular season and playoffs

International

Awards and honours

References

External links

1985 births
Adler Mannheim players
Boston University Terriers men's ice hockey players
Canadian expatriate ice hockey players in China
Canadian expatriate ice hockey players in Germany
Canadian ice hockey right wingers
Canadian people of Irish descent
Canadian sportspeople of Chinese descent
Canadian sportspeople of Hong Kong descent
Chinese ice hockey players
Chinese people of Irish descent
Canadian emigrants to China
Naturalized citizens of the People's Republic of China
Colorado Avalanche draft picks
Colorado Avalanche players
Coquitlam Express players
Düsseldorfer EG players
HC Kunlun Red Star players
Lake Erie Monsters players
Living people
Mikkelin Jukurit players
Nashville Predators players
Norfolk Admirals players
People from Maple Ridge, British Columbia
Phoenix Coyotes players
Portland Pirates players
Ice hockey people from Vancouver
Utah Grizzlies (ECHL) players
Ice hockey players at the 2022 Winter Olympics
Olympic ice hockey players of China
Canadian expatriate ice hockey players in the United States